Freudenberg is a surname. Notable people with the surname include:

 Graham Freudenberg (1934-2019), author and speechwriter for the Australian Labor Party
 Karl Freudenberg (1886–1983), German chemist
 Richard Freudenberg (born 1998), German basketball player
 Winfried Freudenberg (1956-1989), the last person to be killed trying to escape from East Germany

See also
Freudenberger

German-language surnames